Alfréd von Adda (28 August 1888 – 1 February 1980) was a Hungarian equestrian. He competed in two events at the 1928 Summer Olympics.

References

1888 births
1980 deaths
Hungarian male equestrians
Olympic equestrians of Hungary
Equestrians at the 1928 Summer Olympics
Sportspeople from Sibiu
Hungarian emigrants to Italy